René Bricard was a Frenchman who was active in the French Resistance during World War II. He was made a Commander of the Legion of Honour in 2002.

References

French Resistance members
French torture victims
Chevaliers of the Légion d'honneur
Commandeurs of the Légion d'honneur